Almir Garnier Santos (born 22 September 1960 in Rio de Janeiro) is a Brazilian Admiral of the fleet, current Commander of the Brazilian Navy since 31 March 2021.

Career
Garnier was General-Secretary of the Ministry of Defence, the second highest office in the department. He concluded his studies at the Navy School in 1981, as the first in the Armada Corp.

As Lieutenant, he served the União and Independência frigates and the Escola Brasil ship. According to the Ministry, Garnier is Master in Operational Research and System Analysis at the Naval Postgraduate School, in the United States, MBA in International Management at the Federal University of Rio de Janeiro (UFRJ) and course of Politics and Maritime Strategy at the Naval War School for two years.

Dates of rank

References

|-

1960 births
Living people
People from Rio de Janeiro (city)
Brazilian admirals